Archemachus or Archemacchus was an ancient Greek writer who wrote on his native island (Euboea). His works consisted of at least three books. Whether this Archemachus was the author of the grammatical work Metonyms (Hai Metonymiai), is uncertain.

References

Sources
Smith, William (editor); Dictionary of Greek and Roman Biography and Mythology, "Archemachus", Boston, (1867)

Ancient Greek grammarians
Ancient Euboeans
Heracleidae
Year of birth unknown
Year of death unknown